"Spirits in the Material World" is a song by rock trio the Police, written by Sting. It is the opening track for their 1981 album Ghost in the Machine. It was released as a single in 1981 and reached No. 12 in the United Kingdom and No. 11 in the US in early 1982.

Background
"Spirits in the Material World" was written by Sting on a Casio keyboard while in a truck. It was his first experience using a synthesizer.

Andy Summers' presence on the studio track is considerably less pronounced than on the vast majority of Police songs, and in fact, Sting wanted to record it without him entirely. Having written the song on a synthesizer, he wanted for it to use synthesizer instead of guitar, and to play the synthesizer part himself. Summers thought the synthesizer part should be replaced by guitar, and after considerable argument, they compromised by recording the part on both instruments, with a mix such that the synthesizer drowned out much of Summers's guitar. In live performances this part was played on guitar only, with synthesizer used only for background chords. The bass part for the song is distinctively complex, with music producer and cognitive psychologist Daniel Levitin writing that it "takes this rhythmic play to such an extreme that it can be hard to tell where the downbeat even is." The track was recorded at Air Studios Montserrat.

The lyrics comment on the nature of man's existence and the failure of his earthly institutions.

"Spirits in the Material World" eventually saw single release in 1981 as the follow-up to "Every Little Thing She Does Is Magic", making it the third single from Ghost in the Machine in Britain and the second in America.  Billboard called it "less mainstream yet more captivating"  than "Every Little Thing She Does Is Magic" and said that "the repetitive rhythm creates a hypnotic effect."  Record World also compared it to "Every Little Thing She Does Is Magic," saying that it "[takes] reggae one step further into the pop world" and calling it a "hypnotic cut." The single, while not as successful as its predecessors, peaked at No. 12 in Britain and No. 11 in America. It was followed up by "Secret Journey" in America.

The UK B-side of "Spirits in the Material World," "Low Life," was written by Sting around 1977 in the back of a German tour bus. Although the band's drummer Stewart Copeland claimed to have "always loved the song," guitarist Andy Summers claimed that "Neither Stewart or I liked 'Low Life.' I thought the lyric was snobby and it had a kind of corny jazziness to it." The American B-Side, an instrumental song titled "Flexible Strategies", was recorded in Canada while the band jammed for ten minutes while working on Ghost in the Machine, when word came for them to create a B-Side. According to Stewart Copeland, recording this particular song was a disgrace.

Live performances
The band performed the song live during the Ghost in the Machine and Synchronicity tours (the latter of which was included on their Live! album) and it was also included on their first North American setlist during their reunion tour. Since the dissolution of the Police, Sting has often performed the song on solo tours.

In all live performances, the song is played in the key of D minor in contrast to the studio version’s A minor. In most cases, Sting plays a more simplified version of the original bassline to play while singing.

Personnel
Sting – bass guitar, synthesizer, saxophone, lead and backing vocals
Andy Summers – guitar, Prophet-5 synthesizer
Stewart Copeland – drums
Olaf Kubler – saxophone on "Low Life"

Track listing

7-inch: A&M / AMS 8194 (UK) 

 "Spirits in the Material World" – 2:59
 "Low Life" – 3:45

7-inch: A&M / AM 2390 (US) 

 "Spirits in the Material World" – 3:01
 "Flexible Strategies" – 3:44

Charts

Cover versions
In 1995, reggae artist Pato Banton covered the song for the soundtrack to Ace Ventura: When Nature Calls. Sting is featured in the song. The song entered the UK charts at number 36 in January 1996 and stayed there for two weeks. Banton later rerecorded the song (without Sting) for his greatest hits album in 2008. The original version (with Sting) was also featured on the covers album Reggatta Mondatta: A Reggae Tribute to the Police (1997).

References

The Police songs
1981 songs
1982 singles
Songs written by Sting (musician)
Song recordings produced by Hugh Padgham
A&M Records singles